Cedar Township is a township in Dade County, in the U.S. state of Missouri.

Cedar Township derives its name from the community of Cedarville, Missouri.

References

Townships in Missouri
Townships in Dade County, Missouri
Populated places disestablished in 2017